Gabriel Bertrand (born 17 May 1867 in Paris, died 20 June 1962 in Paris) was a French pharmacologist, biochemist and bacteriologist.

Bertrand introduced into biochemistry both the term “oxidase” and the concept of trace elements.

The laccase, a polyphenol oxidase and an enzyme oxidating urishiol and laccol obtained from the lacquer tree, was first studied by Gabriel Bertrand in 1894.

Bertrand's rule refers to the fact that the dose–response curve for many micronutrients is non-monotonic, having an initial stage of increasing benefits with increased intake, followed by increasing costs as excesses become toxic. In 2005, Raubenheimer et al. fed excess carbohydrates to Spodoptera littoralis and extended Bertrand's rule to macronutrients.

In 1894, with Césaire Phisalix, he developed an antivenom for use against snake bites.

Bertrand was made a member of the Académie Nationale de Médecine in 1931. In 1932 he became foreign member of the Royal Netherlands Academy of Arts and Sciences.

References

External links 
 Biography on www.pasteur.fr
 Biography on www.encyclopedia.com

Scientists from Paris
1867 births
1962 deaths
French biochemists
French bacteriologists
Members of the French Academy of Sciences
Members of the Royal Netherlands Academy of Arts and Sciences
Members of the German Academy of Sciences Leopoldina